The 1926 All-Pacific Coast football team consists of American football players chosen by various organizations for All-Pacific Coast teams for the 1926 college football season. The organizations selecting teams in 1926 included the Associated Press (AP) and the United Press (UP).

All-Pacific Coast selections

Quarterbacks
 Bill Kelly, Montana (AP-1 [halfback]; UP-1 [quarterback])
 George Guttormsen, Washington (AP-1)
 Butch Meeker, Washington State (AP-2)

Halfbacks
 Mort Kaer, USC (AP-1; UP-1)
 Dick Hyland, Stanford (AP-2; UP-1)
 Underhill. St. Mary's (AP-2)

Fullbacks
 George Bogue, Stanford (AP-1; UP-1)
 Wes Schulmerich, Oregon Aggies (AP-2)

Ends
 Ted Shipkey, Stanford (AP-1; UP-1)
 Edgar Walker, Stanford (AP-1; UP-1 [tie])
 Red Badgro, USC (AP-2; UP-1 [tie])
 Leroy Schuh, Washington (AP-2)

Tackles
 Jim Dixon, Oregon Aggies (AP-1; UP-1)
 Jesse Hibbs, USC (AP-1)
 Sellman, Stanford (UP-1)
 Pat Wilson, Washington (AP-2)
 Hip Dickerson, Oregon Aggies (AP-2)

Guards
 Fred H. Swan, Stanford (AP-1; UP-1)
 Brice Taylor, USC (AP-1; UP-1)
 Fred Kramer, Washington State (AP-2)
 Ted Gorell, USC (AP-2)

Centers
 Larry Bettencourt, St. Mary's (AP-1) (College Football Hall of Fame)
 Jeff Cravath, USC (AP-2; UP-1)

Key

AP = Associated Press

UP = United Press

See also
1926 College Football All-America Team

References

All-Pacific Coast Football Team
All-Pacific Coast football teams
All-Pac-12 Conference football teams